Lasiopezus is a genus of longhorn beetles of the subfamily Lamiinae.

 Lasiopezus affinis Breuning, 1977
 Lasiopezus brunoi Breuning, 1972
 Lasiopezus hiekei (Breuning, 1968) inq.
 Lasiopezus latefasciatus Breuning, 1938
 Lasiopezus longimanus (Thomson, 1864)
 Lasiopezus marmoratus (Olivier, 1795)
 Lasiopezus nigromaculatus Quedenfeldt, 1882
 Lasiopezus sordidus (Olivier, 1795)
 Lasiopezus variegator (Fabricius, 1781)

References

Ancylonotini